Quo Vadis, Baby? is a 2005 Italian drama film  directed by Gabriele Salvatores.

Cast 

Angela Baraldi: Giorgia Cantini
Gigio Alberti: Andrea Berti
Claudia Zanella: Ada Cantini
Elio Germano: Lucio
Luigi Maria Burruano: Captain Cantini
Andrea Renzi: Commissioner Bruni
Alessandra D'Elia: Anna Loy
Bebo Storti: Lattice
Serena Grandi
Simone Borrelli: Rospetto

Plot
Sixteen years after her sister's tragic suicide, a tough female private detective investigates her death. Giorgia Cantini, 39 y.o., a declining Bolognese detective who works in her father's investigative agency, spends her nights wandering from one room to another. When Aldo -friend of his older sister, Ada, suicidal inexplicably sixteen years before- sends her videotapes that reconstruct the diary of suicide woman, Giorgia begins to dig into the past to shed light on her existence and the one of Ada.

References

External links

2005 films
2005 drama films
Italian drama films
Films directed by Gabriele Salvatores
2000s Italian-language films
2000s Italian films